Diaporthe lokoyae is a fungal plant pathogen.

References

Fungal plant pathogens and diseases
lokoyae
Fungi described in 1968